Kendale Mercury (born on 24 August 1973), is a Vincentian football coach, currently manager of Saint Vincent and the Grenadines national team.

Coaching career
In September 2009, Mercury was interim manager of Saint Vincent and the Grenadines for a 1–1 draw against Saint Kitts and Nevis. In 2010, Mercury was appointed manager of System 3. Following his stint at System 3, Mercury managed Village United and Bequia United.

In December 2018, Mercury was appointed manager of Saint Vincent and the Grenadines.

Managerial statistics

References

1970 births
Living people
People from Bequia
Saint Vincent and the Grenadines football managers
Saint Vincent and the Grenadines national football team managers
Saint Vincent and the Grenadines expatriate football managers
Expatriate football managers in Jamaica
Saint Vincent and the Grenadines expatriate sportspeople in Jamaica